The men's modern pentathlon at the 2004 Summer Olympics took place at the Olympic Modern Pentathlon Centre in Goudi Olympic Complex on 26 August. Thirty-two athletes from 20 nations participated in this event.

Although the event was considered wide open, as no other athlete dominated the sport since 2000, the Russians, Lithuanians and Czechs continued to reach the top positions in the men's competition. Russia's Andrey Moiseev won the gold medal with a score of 5,480 points. Andrejus Zadneprovskis of Lithuania won the nation's first ever Olympic medal in modern pentathlon, taking the silver. Libor Capalini of the Czech Republic, on the other hand, claimed the bronze, winning his nation's first medal in the sport since Jan Bártů in 1976.

Competition format
The modern pentathlon consisted of five events, with all five held in one day.

 Shooting: A 4.5 mm air pistol shooting (the athlete must hit 20 shots, one at each target). Score was based on the number of shots hitting at each target.
 Fencing: A round-robin, one-touch épée competition. Score was based on winning percentage.
 Swimming: A 200 m freestyle race. Score was based on time.
 Horse-riding: A show jumping competition. Score based on penalties for fallen bars, refusals, falls, and being over the time limit.
 Running: A 3 km run.  Starts are staggered (based on points from first four events), so that the first to cross the finish line wins.

Schedule
All times are Greece Standard Time (UTC+2)

Results

* Did not finish the riding course because of the exceeding number of obstacle and time penalties

References

External links
BBC Sport – 2004 Athens
Official Olympic Report
Official Results

1964
Men's
Men's events at the 2004 Summer Olympics